Burak Ağaoğlu (born 23 March 1999) is a Turkish footballer who plays as a midfielder for the amateur side Arapgir Spor.

Career
A youth product of Ankaraspor, Ağaoğlu signed his first contract with the team in 2017. He made his professional debut for Ankaraspor in a 4-0 loss to Beşiktaş on 3 June 2017. He shortly after moved on loan with Mamak in the TFF Third League. In 2019, he transferred to Altındağspor, and thereafter had stints with Erbaaspor, Sultanbeyli Belediyespor, and İskenderun.

References

External links
 
 
 
 
 

1999 births
Sportspeople from Adapazarı
Living people
Turkish footballers
Association football midfielders
Ankaraspor footballers
İskenderun FK footballers
Süper Lig players
TFF Second League players
TFF Third League players